David Sambissa (born 11 January 1996) is a professional footballer who plays as a left-back for Dutch club SC Cambuur. Born in France, he represented the Republic of the Congo national team before switching to the Gabon national team.

Club career
He started his career with Bordeaux, but played predominantly for their reserve squad in the fourth tier, with occasional appearances on the bench for the senior squad.

After spending the 2016–17 season in the fifth tier with US Lège Cap Ferret, he moved to the Netherlands, signing with Twente. He didn't play for the main squad there either.

On 23 April 2018, he signed a one-year contract (with one-year extension option) with another Dutch club, Cambuur.

He made his Eerste Divisie debut for Cambuur on 17 August 2018 in a game against N.E.C., as a starter.

International career
Born in France, Sambissa is of Gabonese and Republic of the Congo descent. He was a youth international for France. He represented the senior Republic of the Congo national team in a friendly 1–0 win over Niger on 10 June 2021.

In October 2021, he switched allegiances to join the Gabonese national team for the 2022 FIFA World Cup qualification games against Angola on 8 and 11 October 2021. He debuted with Gabon in a 2–0 2022 FIFA World Cup qualification win over Angola on 11 October 2021.

References

External links
 Career stats - Voetbal International
 
 

1996 births
Living people
Sportspeople from Saint-Maur-des-Fossés
People with acquired Gabonese citizenship
Gabonese footballers
Gabon international footballers
People with acquired Republic of the Congo citizenship
Republic of the Congo footballers
Republic of the Congo international footballers
French footballers
France youth international footballers
Gabonese people of Republic of the Congo descent
Republic of the Congo people of Gabonese descent
French sportspeople of Gabonese descent
French sportspeople of Republic of the Congo descent
Association football midfielders
FC Girondins de Bordeaux players
US Lège Cap Ferret players
FC Twente players
SC Cambuur players
Championnat National 2 players
Championnat National 3 players
Eredivisie players
Eerste Divisie players
Derde Divisie players
Gabonese expatriate footballers
Republic of the Congo expatriate footballers
French expatriate footballers
Expatriate footballers in the Netherlands
Dual internationalists (football)
2021 Africa Cup of Nations players
Footballers from Val-de-Marne
Black French sportspeople
French expatriate sportspeople in the Netherlands
Republic of the Congo expatriate sportspeople in the Netherlands
Jong FC Twente players
Gabonese expatriate sportspeople in the Netherlands